Mauarii Tehina (born 16 October 1993) is a Tahitian footballer who plays as a midfielder for A.S. Vénus in the Tahiti Ligue 1.

References

1993 births
Living people
French Polynesian footballers
Association football midfielders
Tahiti international footballers
2016 OFC Nations Cup players